Forsterella is a genus of spiders in the family Zodariidae. It was first described in 1991 by Jocqué. , it contains only one species, Forsterella faceta, found in New Zealand.

References

Zodariidae
Monotypic Araneomorphae genera
Spiders of New Zealand